On September 20, 1979, representatives of the newly independent Republic of Kiribati and of the United States met in Tarawa to sign a treaty of friendship between the two nations, known as the Treaty of Tarawa.  More formally, the treaty is entitled, "Kiribati, Treaty of Friendship and Territorial Sovereignty, September 20, 1979"; and subtitled "Treaty of Friendship Between the United States of America and the Republic of Kiribati".  In this treaty, the U.S. acknowledged Kiribati sovereignty over fourteen islands. The treaty was approved by the U.S. Senate on June 21, 1983.  The treaty came into force on September 23, 1983, by the exchange of the instruments of ratification, which took place at Suva, Fiji.  This, together with British cessation of claims, ended the Canton and Enderbury Islands Condominium, which had begun under the terms of the Guano Islands Act. In Art. 3 the US have reserved the right to maintain military bases on the Islands of Canton, Enderbury or Hull.

Islands mentioned in the treaty
 
 Birnie Island
 Canton (Kanton)
 Caroline Island
 Christmas (Kiritimati)
 Enderbury Island
 Flint Island
 Gardner (Nikumaroro)

 Hull (Orona)
 Malden Island
 McKean Island
 Rawaki Island
 Starbuck Island
 Manra Island
 Vostok Island

See also 
Line Islands — divided by the treaty.
Howland and Baker islands — U.S. possessions not included in the treaty.

References

History of Kiribati
Kiribati–United States relations
Treaties of Kiribati
Treaties of the United States
Treaties concluded in 1979
Treaties entered into force in 1983
International territorial disputes of the United States
1979 in Kiribati
1979 in the United States
Disputed islands of Oceania
Guano Islands Act
Line Islands
United States Minor Outlying Islands
Line Islands (Kiribati)